Libertad, meaning "liberty" in Spanish, was a merchant schooner built on the west coast of Mexico for service between Mexico and the Baja California peninsula and along the coast of Mexico. During the Mexican–American War, she was captured at Loreto, Mexico, along with the schooner Fortuna on 1 October 1846 by the United States Navy sloop-of-war  under the command of Commander Samuel Francis Du Pont.

The U.S. navy fitted Libertad for duty as a tender, armed with one 9-pounder gun, retaining her name. She was placed in service with Commodore Robert F. Stockton's Pacific Squadron early in 1847.  Near the end of the war in February 1848, Libertad was sold at public sale.

References

External links
 THE USS LIBERTAD BOMBARDING PUNTA SOMBRERO, William H. Meyers. Watercolor. 1847. Naval Sketches of the War in California. Limited Edition 1,000. Grabhorn Press. San Francisco. 1939. 
 The USS Libertad, tender ship of the USS Dale under command of Lieutenant T. A. M. Craven, USN, bombarding Punta Sombrero in the operation against the communications of Mexican troops at Muleje. 31 October 1847. From the collection of Franklin Delano Roosevelt.

Mexican–American War ships of the United States
Ships built in Mexico
Schooners of the United States Navy
Ships of Mexico